The House at 710 Armada Road South, also known as the Senator Copeland House, is a historic home in Venice, Florida. The home is located at 710 Armada Road South. On August 17, 1989, it was added to the U.S. National Register of Historic Places.

References

External links
 Sarasota County listings at National Register of Historic Places

Houses on the National Register of Historic Places in Sarasota County, Florida
Mediterranean Revival architecture in Florida
Houses completed in 1925